Target Canada Co. was the Canadian subsidiary of the Target Corporation, the eighth-largest retailer in the United States. Formerly headquartered in Mississauga, Ontario, the subsidiary was formed with the acquisition of Zellers store leases from the Hudson's Bay Company (HBC) in January 2011. Target Canada opened its first store in March 2013, and was operating 133 locations by January 2015. Its main competition included Walmart Canada, Loblaws, Shoppers Drug Mart, and Canadian Tire. 

Target Canada was ultimately unsuccessful, with an overly-aggressive expansion initiative, in addition to higher prices and a limited selection of products compared to Target stores in the United States and its Canadian rivals, particularly Walmart. The retail chain racked up losses of $2.1 billion in its lifespan, and was widely viewed as a failure, termed a "spectacular failure" by Amanda Lang of CBC News, "an unmitigated disaster" by Maclean's magazine and "a gold standard case study in what retailers should not do when they enter a new market" by the Financial Post. Target Canada commenced Court-supervised restructuring proceedings in January 2015, and finally shut down all of their stores by April 12, 2015, amid the retail apocalypse.

History

Trademark issues before 2010
In the absence of the Target Corporation chain in Canada, a number of retail companies, without any affiliation to the American company, made use of the "Target" name for various purposes. A regional variety store chain in Newfoundland and Labrador operated under the Target banner during the 1980s and early 1990s. There has also been a liquor store named Target Liquor in Edmonton, and a Target convenience store chain based in Toronto.

Before it entered Canada, Target Corporation attempted to solidify its rights to the "Target" brand name in Canada by buying the Canadian trademark rights of some of these existing users, in addition to filing new applications of its own.

Target Apparel trademark agreement
Target's expansion into Canada was threatened by one other party that claimed the Canadian rights to "Target" with respect to clothing. The Canadian trademark "Target Apparel" was registered in 1981 by Dylex Ltd., a Canadian retailer defunct since the early 2010s, covering "men's clothing, namely suits, pants, jackets, and coats". The rights to the mark were acquired in 2001 by Fairweather Ltd., part of the INC Group of Companies owned by Isaac Benitah. Target Apparel originally served as a private-label clothing brand, and not as the name of a retail store, and Fairweather would not apply to extend its trademark to cover retail services until April 2011.

INC Group opened a small Target Apparel retail store adjacent to the company's head office in December 2003. In late 2010, soon after Target's announcement that it planned to expand into Canada (but before the Zellers announcement), INC began expanding the banner to other higher-profile locations, including conversions of some of its existing Labels stores. Target challenged INC's rights to the Target Apparel trade name on numerous occasions; INC had succeeded in retaining those rights, but faced a further court challenge with a trial set to start in 2012.

On February 1, 2012, it was announced that Fairweather Ltd. and Target reached an agreement concerning the use of the Target name in Canada. Under this agreement, Fairweather would cease use of the Target Apparel name by 2013, giving Target Canada complete ownership of the Target brand in Canada.

2010: Consideration of Canadian operations
Regular rumours surfaced since at least 2004 that Target was interested in expanding into Canada by acquiring Zellers outright. In January 2010, Target publicly indicated long-term plans to expand internationally, likely including Canada, but that those plans would not take effect until 2013 at the earliest.

2011–2013: Leaseholds acquisition and partnership
On January 13, 2011, Target announced that it would purchase the lease agreements of up to 220 Zellers stores for C$1.825 billion. Under the agreement, Zellers would sublease the properties, and continue to operate them as Zellers locations until at the earliest January 2012 and at latest the end of March 2013.

Target did not buy the Zellers chain, which was left with 64 stores in less desirable locations. HBC failed to find a buyer for the remaining stores and planned to continue operating Zellers as a smaller chain. However, the geographical constraints of serving these far-flung Zellers outlets meant that operating them was no longer economically viable, so HBC announced on July 26, 2012, that it would close almost all of these stores.

In May 2011, Target revealed its first 105 selections and stated that the vast majority of those in this first group would be converted to Target outlets. In September 2011, Target unveiled 84 additional selections, bringing the number of Zellers leases acquired to 189 below the prospective upper number of 220 announced in January. The first store opening cycle would be in March/April 2013, followed by four additional cycles later that year. Zellers locations to be converted were typically closed for six to nine months for significant remodelling and renovation. Target announced plans to hire 27,000 new employees to support its expansion into Canada, including 5,000 in Quebec, and that its food and grocery items in Canada would be supplied by Sobeys.

After the Zellers stores at the selected locations closed, Target planned to renovate between 125 and 135 of them, and reopen them under the Target banner. Target would sell the remaining 64 to 74 acquired locations to other retailers, including 39 already resold to Walmart Canada.

Unlike Walmart's entry to Canada with the acquisition of the Woolco stores in 1994, Zellers employees were not retained by Target nor Walmart, and they had to re-apply for their position to continue working in their same locations. Target Canada stated that former Zellers workers were guaranteed an interview though not a job; however, the United Food and Commercial Workers of Canada complained that many Zellers employees were not hired, including those with long years of service.

Target confirmed the list of its locations in July 2012. The chain finalized its 127 stores to open in 2013. Of this total, 125 were converted former Zellers stores. The other two locations in Niagara Falls and Centre Laval were sites that had been occupied by Walmart stores. The first Target stores in Canada were opened on March 5, 2013, in the Ontario communities of Guelph, Fergus, and Milton, being close to one of Target Canada's three distribution centres.

2013–2015: Years of operation

Target Canada had supply chain problems, but its parent company did not want the planned opening date to be delayed, since they did not want to continue paying rent on unopened stores.

On March 5, 2013, three Target stores in Milton, Fergus and Guelph, Ontario, were opened to the public and operating as test stores, and a further 17 stores in Ontario opened on March 19, 2013. Four additional stores in Ontario were opened on March 28, 2013, followed by a number of openings in three western provinces on May 6, 2013. On July 16, 2013, Target opened more stores in four provinces, including in the cities of Regina and Saskatoon. Target opened more stores between September 17 and October 18, including in the provinces of Quebec and Nova Scotia. It opened 33 locations between November 13 and 22, including in the provinces of New Brunswick, Prince Edward Island and Newfoundland and Labrador. On March 14, 2014, Target opened three stores in the cities of Toronto, Edmonton and Victoria. On August 1, 2014, it opened three stores in the cities of Barrie, Mississauga and Candiac, Quebec.

Target Canada included smaller Starbucks stores in the majority of its locations. A notable Canadian clothing brand, Roots, was "temporarily" sold in Target Canada.

Early results
Target Canada president Tony Fisher expected that some Canadian consumers would continue to cross the border and shop at Target stores in the United States. Fisher acknowledged that the Canadian stores would not have price parity with their U.S. counterparts, saying "Transportation costs are higher, distribution costs are higher, fuel costs are higher, wage rates vary across the country, the tax rates are different, cost of goods are different, the duties — I think the scale we have here in Canada is quite different from the incredibly different, densely populated U.S. marketplace." Because of complexities and other legal requirements, Target's existing distribution network could not be used to service Target's Canadian locations. In addition, Canadian Target stores did not have local authority to order their own merchandise; this resulted in the Windsor, Ontario, stores stocking Toronto Maple Leafs and Toronto Blue Jays apparel, instead of that of the Detroit Red Wings and Detroit Tigers, which were more popular in Windsor, given its proximity to Detroit across the Detroit River. Supply chain and demand issues also led to situations where some of the early locations were not adequately stocked in certain product categories, resulting in empty shelves. The supply chain problems were blamed on using a brand new SAP inventory software and not giving sufficient time for staff to work out the system's problems, as the parent company refused to push back the planned launch date as they did not want to keep paying rent on unopened stores.

Target Corporation's expansion into Canada hoped to capitalize on Canadian shoppers who frequently crossed the border for its U.S. stores. However, this may have backfired as Canadian shoppers felt that Target Canada stores failed to meet the high expectations set by their U.S. counterparts. Target Canada enjoyed a strong opening, but subsequent results were disappointing, dragging down its parent company's second-quarter results. Despite the initial high traffic at Target's new stores, customers were not returning frequently enough to these stores to buy the basic household items, as that market was dominated by entrenched Canadian grocery and drug retail chains such as Loblaws, Shoppers Drug Mart, and Walmart Canada. In addition, while Target Canada aimed to have its customers do "one-stop shopping", Canadian consumers generally pick and choose between different retailers' strengths. While Target Canada stores were said to be an improvement over the untidy Zellers stores, some Canadians lamented that they missed the deals found at Zellers.

Paul Trussell, retailing analyst at Deutsche Bank, suggested that "traffic has slowed below expectations in recent weeks, driven partly by Canadians’ perception that prices are too high, both relative to Walmart Canada and Target's U.S. locations. While shoppers appreciate the higher quality assortment, especially in discretionary categories, the complaints on pricing were alarming." Target failed to anticipate that Canadian consumers would expect the retailer to match the lower prices in its U.S. stores, leading to some alienation and confusion, although Target CEO Gregg Steinhafel defended this practice saying "trying to compare prices at Target Canada with that of certain Target stores in the U.S. would be like comparing prices in Boston to prices in rural Iowa". Deutsche Bank's pricing survey on 31 health, beauty and food items at Canadian Target and Walmart stores found that while Target had a cheaper basket of goods by 19 cents, Walmart had a pricing advantage of 65 percent of the popular items in the basket thanks to its own "Rollback" prices, likely furthering consumers’ current price perceptions. Other American chains operating in Canada did not suffer a backlash from Canada–U.S. pricing disparities as much, likely as Target had hyped its Canadian stores to provide the same experience as their U.S. counterparts.

Target projected for its Canadian operations to bring in ten percent of its profits by 2017. However, experts suggested that it wanted too much and too quickly from Canadians, while underestimating the domestic competition. The disappointing results from Canadian stores were said to be a major reason, along with the January 2014 major security breach, for the resignation of parent company CEO Gregg Steinhafel, though Target reiterated its commitment to the Canadian market. Two weeks after Steinhafel's abrupt departure, Target Canada president Anthony S. "Tony" Fisher was dismissed and replaced by Mark Schindele, who had been serving as Target's senior vice-president of merchandising operations. Subsequent commentators did not blame Fisher, "the odds were stacked against him from the start, given the extremely tight timeline and the thin margin for error."

Around the time that Mark Schindele took over, Target Canada had largely sorted out its inventory issues. However, Brian Cornell, who replaced Steinhafel as CEO of the parent company, was a company outsider who had reportedly pushed for Target Canada to be shut down if its financial performance did not improve.

2015: Closure

On January 15, 2015, Target Canada announced that it had commenced Court-supervised restructuring proceedings under the Companies' Creditors Arrangement Act and that it would close all 133 of its Canadian stores. Two planned new store openings, one at the Harbour Plaza condo project in the South Core of downtown Toronto, and the Bayshore Shopping Centre in the west end of Ottawa, were cancelled due to the closure. Likewise, plans to open a smaller Target store in the former Zellers location in Lawrence Square Shopping Centre (later renamed Lawrence Allen Centre in late 2019) in Toronto similar to the CityTarget format were also cancelled and were replaced with an additional public mall entrance, Marshalls, HomeSense and PetSmart by early 2016 (and Structube a few years later but before the mall's renaming).

By 2015, the subsidiary had lost $2.1 billion and was not projected to make a profit until at least 2021. Target Canada would have been unable to meet its employees' payroll for the week of January 16, 2015, if it had not filed for Court protection from creditors.

Liquidation sales began at the stores the following day; Target began to close stores on March 18, 2015, with 58 locations scheduled to close that week, and 58 in total closed by April 5, 2015. The remaining 58 stores closed on April 12, 2015.

In May 2015, the company returned some of its leases back to their landlords, and began the process of auctioning off leases and properties to other new owners. Canadian Tire announced plans to acquire 12 locations, Walmart Canada reached a deal to acquire 13 locations (including the aborted Bayshore Shopping Centre location) and one of its distribution centres, and Lowe's also reached a deal to acquire 13 locations and a distribution centre. Giant Tiger also acquired a part of a Target location. Metro's discount supermarket chain Super C would open stores in two former Target stores in Quebec.

Target International Shopping

In October 2015, Target began offering international shipping on goods sold on their online site, which includes Canada. Prices for Canadian shoppers are converted to Canadian dollars, excluding duties and taxes. As of February 2020, Target has discontinued shipping to Canada and other international locations.

Timeline

2011
 12 January: Agreement signed.
 13 January: Announcement of sale.
 26 May: Announcement of first 105 site selections.
 23 September: Announcement of final 84 site selections and partnership with Sobeys.
 23 September: Walmart Canada announces completion of acquisition from Target Canada of leases for 39 locations occupied by Zellers.

2012
 31 January: An earliest possible date that Target might require some acquired locations to be vacated by Zellers.

2013
 5 March: First Target Canada locations opened in Guelph, Fergus, and Milton, all of which are in the Ontario Peninsula.
 19 March: More Target Canada locations opened in Ontario, including East York Town Centre, Aurora Shopping Centre, Cloverdale Mall, Cambridge Centre, Centre Mall (in Hamilton), Shoppers World Brampton, Centerpoint Mall, Taunton Road Power Centre, Masonville Place, Upper Canada Mall, Devonshire Mall, and Durham Centre.
 28 March: Burlington Mall (since renamed Burlington Centre), Shoppers World Danforth, Square One Shopping Centre and Trinity Common Mall locations opened.
 31 March: All acquired locations must be vacated by Zellers by this date.
 7 May: More Target Canada stores opened in 9 British Columbia locations, 10 Alberta locations and 3 Manitoba locations.
 14 May: Target Canada stores opened in Pine Centre Mall in Prince George and The Shoppes at Shawnessy in Calgary.
 16 July: Target Canada stores opened in two British Columbia locations, two Alberta locations, three Saskatchewan locations and 11 Ontario locations including Intercity Shopping Centre in Thunder Bay.
 23 July: The Cataraqui Centre location opened in Kingston, Ontario.
 30 July: The Bramalea City Centre location opened in Brampton, Ontario.
 17 September: Target Canada stores opened in four locations in Eastern Ontario, seven Quebec locations and three Nova Scotia locations.
 18 October: Target Canada stores opened 9 locations all in the province of Quebec.
 13 November: Target Canada opened 31 more locations in nine provinces including New Brunswick, Prince Edward Island and Newfoundland and Labrador.
 22 November: Target Canada opened two more locations in the Pen Centre in St. Catharines, Ontario and Carrefour de l'Estrie in Sherbrooke, Quebec.

2014
 14 March: Target Canada opened three locations in The Stockyards in Toronto, Ontario, Kingsway Mall in Edmonton, Alberta and Hillside Shopping Centre in Victoria, British Columbia.
 1 August: Target Canada opened three locations in Park Place in Barrie, Ontario, Erin Mills Town Centre in Mississauga, Ontario and Carrefour Candiac in Candiac, Quebec.
 17 October: Target Canada opened one location in Polo Park in Winnipeg.

2015
 15 January: Target announces it was ceasing all Canadian retail operations and would proceed to close 133 outlets.
 23 January: Target Canada closed all Starbucks outlets in their stores.
 4 February: Target Canada received court approval to begin the liquidation process. 
 5 February: All Target Canada stores started liquidation process.
 6 March: Ivanhoé Cambridge and Oxford Landlords purchased back 11 coveted Target store leases at premier mall locations for an estimated $138 million.
 18 March: Stratford, Ontario; Longueuil and Edmonton (Bonnie Doon Centre) locations closed.
 22 March: 13 more locations closed.
 27 March–2 April: 62 more locations closed.
 4 April: Bramalea City Centre store in Brampton closed with most other stores left opened.
 12 April: All Target Canada stores were closed by this date.
 6 May: Canadian Tire acquired leases for 12 stores at a cost of $17.7 million.
 8 May: Walmart Canada acquired leases for 13 stores and distribution centre in Cornwall, Ontario for $165 million. The new stores would create about 3,400 jobs.
 11 May: Lowe's Canadian unit acquired 13 store leases and distribution centre in Milton, Ontario for $151 million. The stores created about 2,000 jobs.
 15 May: Target US had set up an employee trust fund to guarantee Target Canada team members get paid till May 15 whether the store closed earlier or not.
 15 May: Rona bought the lease for one store in Chilliwack, BC, but on February 3, 2016, an agreement could not be reached.
 30 June: The court-approved real-estate process was completed.
 24 July: Lowe's bought 12 stores and distribution centres in Milton, Ontario for $147.75 million.

Post-closure replacements timeline
Source

2016
25 February: Walmart replaced the Central City Target location in Surrey, British Columbia.
3 March: Fit4Less opened a portion of the former Bedford Place Mall Target store in Bedford, Nova Scotia.
1 April: Canadian Tire opened two location in the former Target locations In Mountain Road in Moncton, NB and Bayers Lake Business Park In Halifax NS.
22 April: Lee Valley Tools opened a location in former Orchard Plaza location in Kelowna, BC.
14 May: Giant Tiger opened a location to replace the Target location in Fergus, Ontario.
28 June: Toys "R" Us and Sport Chek moved into the former Willowbrook Shopping Centre location in Langley, BC as part of the mall's expansion. They opened in the spring and summer of 2017, respectively.
17 July: Stitches Factory Outlet opened a location in former Bonnie Doon Shopping Centre Target location in Edmonton, AB.
4 August: Demolition of a portion of the location at Devonshire Mall in Windsor, Ontario began and was replaced with a Metro supermarket on August 24, 2017 and a relocated food court on June 27, 2018.
12 August: Michaels, Value Village and World Gym replaced the Stratford, Ontario Target store altogether.
29 September: Farm Boy replaced the Pickering Town Centre location.
10 November: Sports Experts/Atmosphere opened at Place Vertu in Montreal.
8 December: Walmart replaced Erin Mills Town Centre Target location in Mississauga.

2017
5 January: The Rec Room (upper level), Marshalls and HomeSense (lower level) replaced Masonville Place Target in London, Ontario. Later in 2017, Winners/HomeSense would take over the bottom floor of the West Edmonton Mall space formerly leased to Target, half of the second floor would have a Buy Buy Baby location, the other half will be an International Clothiers store.
16 January: The Target store at Cataraqui Centre was replaced with several stores including Marshalls and Indigo Books and Music.
9 March: Saks Off 5th replaced part of Bramalea City Centre Target store.
9 March: Saks Off 5th replaced Pickering Town Centre Target location.
17 March: Marshalls and HomeSense replaced the old Target in Kingsway Mall, Edmonton, Alberta.
28 April: Safeway opened a store in a portion of the Target location in Sherwood Park Mall, Sherwood Park, Alberta, which replaced the old location on the north side of the mall.
16 June: London Drugs opened a new store in the former Target's St. Albert Centre location in St. Albert, Alberta.
14 July: Sobeys Extra replaced the Target store at Shoppers Mall in Brandon, Manitoba. It is currently the largest Sobeys supermarket in Canada.
21 October: Giant Tiger opened a back portion of the former Bedford Place Mall Target location in Bedford, NS.
3 November: Indigo Books and Music opened a store in a portion of Sherwood Park Mall's former Target space.
16 November: Nations Fresh Foods opened Nations Experience, a grocery store and entertainment centre in the former Target location in Stock Yards Village mall in the Stockyards within the northern part of The Junction neighbourhood in Toronto.
The previous Target Canada location located in Park Place within Barrie, Ontario, has slowly been divided into several new businesses such as X-Play Amusements, Ashley HomeStore and Toys "R" Us.

2018
22 February: Saks Fifth Avenue opened at the former Target location at CF Chinook Centre in Calgary.
3 May: Urban Planet opened at the former Target's Sherwood Park Mall location in Sherwood Park, Alberta.
16 August: T&T Supermarket opened a store in the first floor portion of the Target location at Lansdowne Centre in Richmond, British Columbia.
20 August: Target store in the Mic Mac Mall Dartmouth was demolished to open Urban Planet and separate Winners from HomeSense.
24 August: Hudson's Bay opened at the Carrefour Angrignon in LaSalle, Quebec.
7 September: Market & Co. opened at the former Target at the Upper Canada Mall in Newmarket, Ontario.
11 October: Walmart replaced the former Metropolis at Metrotown Target store in Burnaby, British Columbia.
Fall 2018: Marshalls/HomeSense and Old Navy replaced the Hillcrest Mall Target store in Richmond Hill, Ontario.
Late Fall 2018: Indigo Books and Music, Uniqlo, The Rec Room, and the Food District (upscale food court) replaced the Target location at Square One Shopping Centre in Mississauga. All stores and restaurants were opened by Spring 2019.

2019
22 August: Walmart Supercentre replaced the former Pen Centre Target location in St. Catharines.
21 November: Marché Adonis replaced the former St. Laurent Boulevard Target location in Ottawa.
14 December: Canada Computers & Electronics replaced the former Target store at Centerpoint Mall in Toronto's north end.

2020
13 April: St. Michael's Kidney Care opens at former Target location at East York Town Centre in Toronto.
22 September: Canadian department store Winners opened a new store in Barrie, Ontario, completing the transformation of the former Target Canada location.
Early December: Black & McDonald opens a nuclear training facility at the former Target store in Bowmanville, Ontario to support the ongoing refurbishment project at the nearby Darlington Nuclear Generating Station.

2021
4 March: Save-On-Foods opened a portion of the former Cottonwood Mall Target store in Chilliwack, BC.
May 2021: Old Navy and Club 16 Trevor Linden Fitness opened a back portion of the former Cottonwood Mall Target store in Chilliwack, BC.
14 December: Goodlife Fitness opened the largest fitness club in Canada, in the former Hazeldean Mall Target store in Kanata, Ontario.

Gallery

REDcard
The REDcard was offered in Canada as either a debit card or a credit card. Around 30,000 Canadians signed up for the REDcard prior to Target's opening in 2013. Like its American counterpart, the cards offered a five-percent discount on almost all Target purchases and the debit card allowed up to a $60 cash withdrawal. The Canadian version did not offer free online shipping (as online shopping was unavailable in Canada when Target's Canadian operations were active), a 30-day extended return period, a one-percent donation to K–12 schools on almost all purchases, a Visa credit card or a store-only credit card that are available in the United States. Target Canada stores did not accept U.S.-issued REDcards in its stores. Target Canada continued to honour the REDcard throughout its liquidation sales.

Target Canada: The Play 
Robert Motum, a Toronto-based playwright, spent two years interviewing and gathering the stories of former Target Canada employees. The words of 60 employees have been compiled into A Community Target – a verbatim play that examines the human story of Canada's precarious retail climate and depicts Target's whirlwind venture north of the border. The piece, commissioned by Outside the March Theatre Company, is to be staged inside an empty Target store.

See also
Retail apocalypse

References

External links

 Official website (Archive)
 Off-Target: How a U.S. retail giant misread the Canadian market Chris Sorensen, January 21, 2015, Maclean's
 Target International site (directs to Canadian page when user domain is identified as Canadian)

Defunct retail companies of Canada
Department stores of Canada
Discount stores of Canada
Target Corporation
Companies that have filed for bankruptcy in Canada
Canadian subsidiaries of foreign companies
Companies based in Mississauga
Retail companies established in 2011
Retail companies disestablished in 2015
2011 establishments in Canada
2015 disestablishments in Canada
Toy retailers of Canada